Charles T. Nesser (1903 – February 26, 1970) was a professional football player in the National Football League for the Columbus Panhandles. Charlie played only season, 1921, in the NFL. He was son of Ted Nesser, a member of the infamous Nesser Brothers. During the 1921 season, six of the Nessers played for the Panhandles, with Charlie being the seventh family member on the team. The 1921 team was coached by his father, Ted, who served as a player-coach. This is marked as the only father-son combination to play together in NFL history.

References

Notes

1903 births
1970 deaths
Players of American football from Columbus, Ohio
Columbus Panhandles players
Nesser family (American football)